Bradley Frank Gillis (born 15 June 1957) is a guitarist most famous for playing with the band Night Ranger. He was in the band Rubicon during the 1970s before Night Ranger. Since forming in 1979, Gillis and drummer Kelly Keagy are the only members to have appeared in every incarnation of the band and all studio releases. However, Keagy missed several shows for the first time in 2017. On Saturday, May 8th, 2021, Gillis was absent from a Night Ranger show for the first time in the band's history (he was recovering from rotator cuff surgery). He has also played for Ozzy Osbourne and Fiona, and has released solo albums. Gillis’s musical side projects include placing over 300 songs for ESPN’s Sports Center, The X Games, Fox Sports, Tiger Woods Sony PlayStation Games, EA Sports, The Fuse Channel and many others. He has appeared in over a dozen music videos, with TV performances on American Bandstand, Solid Gold, Rock & Roll Tonight and thousands of live concerts.  He also participated in the one-time collaboration, Hear 'n Aid, for the promotional single, "Stars," which helped raise $1 million for famine relief in Africa.  He was one of several lead guitarists to contribute guitar solos for the cause, including Vivian Campbell, Buck Dharma, and Neal Schon.  His first solo album Gilrock Ranch produced a top twenty single, “Honest to God,” which was co-written and sung by Gregg Allman.

Career

1978–1979: Rubicon 
Jerry Martini formed the funk-rock band Rubicon with future Night Ranger founding members Gillis and Jack Blades. Rubicon recorded two albums on 20th Century Fox Records – Rubicon, and American Dreams, scoring one minor hit single entitled "I’m Gonna Take Care of Everything". Rubicon played the 1978 California Jam II rock festival before 250,000 people. Future Ozzy Osbourne bandmate Rudy Sarzo saw Gillis's Cal Jam performance and was very impressed. Rubicon broke up in 1979 and Gillis formed the short-lived club band Stereo with future Night Ranger members Blades and Kelly Keagy.

1982: Ozzy Osbourne
With the sudden death of guitarist Randy Rhoads in a plane crash while on tour in March 1982, Bernie Torme was quickly brought in as his replacement. After a handful of shows it became apparent that Torme's blues-based style was not a good match for Osbourne's style of music and Gillis was subsequently hired as his replacement. Osbourne, drinking heavily while still coming to terms with the loss of Rhoads, took his frustrations out on Gillis and treated him very poorly. As a result, Gillis left Osbourne's band after completing the 1982 Diary of a Madman tour and he returned to Night Ranger. Gillis can be heard playing lead guitar on Osbourne’s 1982 Speak of the Devil live album and on the DVD of the same title.

Equipment
Over the course of his career, Gillis has used several different models of guitars by various brands.  He has been a longtime user of his 1962 Fender Stratocaster and 1971 Gibson Les Paul, and in the 1980s played Hamer and Jackson Soloists, which he still periodically uses today.  He also has an extensive collection of over 100 various vintage guitars, most notably Les Pauls, Flying V's, Martin and Gibson acoustics. Today he uses his Fernandes Brad Gillis model, along with his 1962 Stratocaster, PRS 513 model and an Atomic Guitars Red, White and Blue American flag guitar. Gillis uses Taylor acoustic guitars in the studio and live with his band Night Ranger. Gillis's amplifiers are mainly Mesa Boogie but also uses Soldano, Marshall and vintage Fender amps in the studio. Gillis uses original Floyd Rose non fine tuner tremolo bridges, Nady built-in wireless systems and metal picks by Star Access Guitar Picks.

Discography

Solo albums
 Gilrock Ranch (1993)
 Alligator (2000)

with Rubicon
 Rubicon (1978)
 America Dreams (1979)

with Night Ranger
Dawn Patrol (1982)
Midnight Madness (1983)
7 Wishes (1985)
Big Life (1987)
Man in Motion (1988)
Feeding off the Mojo (1995)
Neverland (1997)
Seven (1998)
Hole in the Sun (2007)
Somewhere in California (2011)
High Road (2014)
Don't Let Up (2017)
 ATBPO (2021)

with Ozzy Osbourne
 Speak of the Devil (1982)

with Hear 'n Aid
 Stars (1985)

with Fiona
 Heart Like a Gun (1989)

with Vicious Rumors
Warball (2006)

Guest appearances
Derek Sherinian - Blood of the Snake (2006)
Vicious Rumors - Razorback Killers (2011)
Queensrÿche - Frequency Unknown (2013)

Instructional videos
Star Licks Productions (1986)

References

Living people
1957 births
Musicians from Honolulu
American rock guitarists
American male guitarists
Night Ranger members
The Ozzy Osbourne Band members
Randy Rhoads
Guitarists from Hawaii
20th-century American guitarists
Rubicon (American band) members